The year 705 BC was a year of the pre-Julian Roman calendar. In the Roman Empire, it was known as year 49 Ab urbe condita. The denomination 705 BC for this year has been used since the early medieval period, when the Anno Domini calendar era became the prevalent method in Europe for naming years.

Events

 Sennacherib ascends the throne of Assyria

Births
 Achaemenes, eponymous apical ancestor of the Achaemenid dynasty of rulers from Persis.

Deaths
 Sargon II, Assyrian emperor
 Marquis Xiaozi of Jin, ruler of the state of Jin

References

700s BC